Phillip Rhodes may refer to:
 Phillip Rhodes (drummer)
 Phillip Rhodes (baritone)

See also
 Philip Rhodes, American naval architect